Archelaïs was a town in the Roman province of Palaestina Prima, corresponding to modern Khirbet el-Beiyudat (also spelled Khirbat al-Bayudat). It was founded by Herod the Great's son Archelaus to house workers for his date plantation in the Jericho area. It is represented on the Madaba mosaic map with a towered entrance flanked by two other towers.

History
In Christian times, the town became a bishopric. The names of two of its bishops: Timotheus, who took part in two anti-Eutyches synods held in Constantinople in 448 and 449, and Antiochus, who was at the Council of Chalcedon in 451.

No longer a residential bishopric, Archelaïs is today listed by the Catholic Church as a titular see.

Inscriptions on the floor of a church discovered among the ruins of the town indicate that it was paved with Byzantine mosaics during the 560s.

Current destruction
The archaeological site (31°57′58″N 35°28′18″E), standing at the northern outskirts of the Palestinian West Bank town of al-Auja at Khirbet el-Beiyudat, is gradually being covered by modern construction and devastated by treasure hunters.

References

Catholic titular sees in Asia
Ancient Jewish settlements of Judaea